Tommy Breheny was a Gaelic football manager and player. He managed his native Sligo between 2006 and 2007. In that time he led the county to a Connacht Senior Football Championship. Breheny won four Sligo Senior Football Championships as a player with the St Mary's club and led it to a further Sligo SFC as manager in 2001. He is married with four children.

Initially serving as part of Sligo manager Dominic Corrigan's backroom team, Breheny succeeded Corrigan for 2006 and 2007, then resigned as Sligo manager in October 2007. He is the older brother of Mark Breheny, who played for Sligo at the time.

References

1960s births
Living people
Gaelic football managers
St Mary's (Sligo) Gaelic footballers